C'est pour vivre (meaning "It's for Living") is a French-language compilation album by Canadian singer Celine Dion, released in Europe, Asia, Australia and South America in 1997. It features fourteen rare songs recorded between 1983 and 1987. The album was issued under many different titles, with many different covers, and by various music labels. It reached number thirty-two in Belgium Wallonia and number forty-nine in the United Kingdom.

Background and content
After the success of D'eux, which became the best-selling French-language album of all time, various music labels around the world issued compilations with Dion's early and rare recordings from the '80s. After 1995's Gold Vol. 1, a compilation with another fourteen songs was released in 1997. It was issued in Europe, Asia, Australia and South America under many various titles: C'est pour vivre, The French Love Album, Les premières années: The Very Best of the Early Years, Mon ami, Les hits de Céline Dion volume 2 or D'amour française. They were released with many different covers and by various music labels.

Critical reception and commercial performance
Charlotte Dillon of AllMusic gave the album four out of five stars and wrote that even if you can't understand the words, you can "enjoy the sound and feel the emotions during such notable tunes" as "Je ne veux pas", "En amour", "Ne me plaignez pas", and "Les chemins de ma maison". On 3 February 1997, C'est pour vivre was issued in the United Kingdom where it reached number forty-nine in March 1997. In July 1997, it also debuted on the chart in Belgium Wallonia peaking at number thirty-two the next month.

Track listing
All tracks are produced by Eddy Marnay and Rudi Pascal, except where noted.

Charts

Release history

References

External links
 

1997 compilation albums
Albums produced by Eddy Marnay
Celine Dion compilation albums